The 361st Infantry Division was an infantry division of the German Army during the Second World War, active from 1943 to 1945. It was redesignated as a Volksgrenadier division in 1944. It saw active service on the Eastern Front when the Soviets launched Operation Bagration, during which it suffered significant losses. It later fought in France before being absorbed by the 559th Volksgrenadier Division (de) on 10 March 1945.

Operational history

The 361st Infantry Division was formed in Denmark during the period from October to November 1943, and formally established on 26 November under the command of Generalleutnant Baron Siegmund von Schleinitz. The division nominally fell within the responsibility of Wehrkreis VI. At its core were remnants of the 86th Infantry Division, which had been disbanded due to significant losses incurred during fighting on the Eastern Front. Three battalions of infantry also came from the 94th and 137th Infantry Divisions, as well as the 141st Reserve Division. 

The division was dispatched to the Eastern Front in March 1944 and the following month became involved in the fighting in the Kamenets-Podolsky pocket. In the summer of 1944, the Soviet forces launched Operation Bagration and, as part of XIII Army Corps, it incurred casualties during this time. It, along with the rest of XIII Army Corps, became encircled at Brody and was trapped. While some personnel were able to fight their way out, its commander, Generalleutnant Gerhard Lindemann, and most of his men became prisoners of war. What was left of the division retreated into Poland and it was transferred to Germany for a rest and refit.

Now under the command of Oberst Alfred Philippi, it received reinforcements from, among others, the 569th Volksgrenadier Division. It was now designated as a Volksgrenadier division and returned to action in the Arnhem sector. It was shifted to eastern France and then in the Vosges Mountains where it took on troops from the 553rd Infantry Division (de). The division ceased to exist on 10 March 1945, when it was absorbed by the 559th Volksgrenadier Division (de).

On 20 April 1945 troops of the 361th V.G.D. have been seen by Dutch resistance in the Alblasserwaard and Betuwe (some of troops in the towns Buren, Kerk-Avezaath, Zoelen, Asch, Zoelmond and Beusichem were of 361 V.G.D.), bicycles were seen with the two crossed horseheads a regimental h.q.flag and V.G.D.361 written on it same goes for some cars (except for the missing Regt.hq flag). 
At 24 April 45 a sign was seen in Buren with "Philippi" further more some redcross-cars wereseen in Zoelen at the same date, on the cars the sign with the two crossed horseheads and "vers.regt.361". So it seems that the parts of the division was not totally absorbed by the 559th V.G.D. or the staff was waiting for a new task. (NIOD, Amsterdam)

Commanders
Generalleutnant Baron Siegmund von Schleinitz (20 November 1943 – 29 May 1944);
Generalmajor  Gerhard Lindemann (30 May – 31 October 1944);
Generalmajor Alfred Philippi (1 September 1944 – 10 March 1945).

Notes
Footnotes

Citations

References

Military units and formations established in 1943
Military units and formations disestablished in 1945
Volksgrenadier divisions
0*361